Hearts are Trumps or Love All is a 1934 German comedy film directed by Carl Boese and starring Jenny Jugo, Paul Hörbiger, and Friedrich Benfer.

The film's art direction was by Alfred Bütow and Erich Czerwonski.

Plot 
Toni, the daughter of a rich hotel owner, is looking for a man who doesn't just want her for her money. One day her father takes the yacht on an inspection trip south and takes Toni with him. Dressed as a cabin boy, she meets young Bert Reno, who also owns a hotel and owns a small inn on the coast. When she meets him again on land in women's clothing, she claims to be the sister of cabin boy Anton. Toni is hired as a waitress at Bert's hotel, hoping to find out if he's a good husband-to-be. Things get complicated when Mrs. Neubauer, a childhood sweetheart of Toni's father, arrives. Coincidentally, he sees his daughter Toni again when they meet in Reno's hotel. Paulsen quickly understands that she works here incognito and therefore knows how to behave: he doesn't tell her.

Paulsen even goes so far as to be particularly cold and critical of his daughter: he doesn't like anything that Bert's new employee does. The fact that Reno is helping Toni at this moment is very convenient for father Paulsen, since he sincerely hopes that this colleague could finally be a man for (his daughter)'s life. Meanwhile, Bert doesn't want to lose contact with Toni's apparent brother, cabin boy Anton. For Toni, this means continuing the strenuous game of hide-and-seek that involved all sorts of disguises. If she has to play Anton now and again for Bert, she at least wants to use this role to warm him up more to Anton's supposed sister Toni. When Toni makes a terrible mistake as a hotel employee, Bert feels compelled to fire her. But he quickly realizes how much he misses the young woman. Bert finds out that Toni is Paulsen's daughter and rushes to the yacht on the quay to speak to Anton. Toni, who has just arrived there himself, cannot change quickly and is in the process of changing when Bert bursts in. Only now does he realize that Anton and Toni are one and the same person. You fall into your arms.

Cast

References

Bibliography

External links 
 

1934 films
Films directed by Carl Boese
1930s German-language films
Films of Nazi Germany
German comedy films
1934 comedy films
German black-and-white films
1930s German films